Masjid DarusSalam is a mosque in Lombard, Illinois, completed in 2013. The mosque is home to the DarusSalam Seminary, a national project which aims to educate the Islamic community in the traditional Islamic sciences.

Building
The 22,000-square-foot building is located on North Avenue and includes a main prayer hall, classrooms, administrative offices, and a community hall. In 2021, the seminary completed "Phase 2," their Seminary expansion, including a gymnasium, library, and additional classrooms. As of 2022, the project has been augmented and is fully functional.

Phase 2 
In late 2017, Masjid DarusSalam began constructing their Phase 2 Project: the National Seminary Campus. The schema envisioned a larger, exclusive women's prayer hall, an indoor gym, a basketball court, a library featuring over 20,000 books, and supplementary classrooms for students.

In 2015, the DarusSalam administration purchased 3.5 additional acres of land. Beginning in 2017, the National Seminary Campus and its supplementary parking lot were constructed within this plot of land. The parking lot allowed for an additional 400 individual parking spaces for community members.

Programs 
Masjid DarusSalam offers monthly seminars and weekly programs. As of 2022, they have augmented summer programs and children's programs, a Sunday school, a 7-year academic program known as the "Takmīl program," a Qurʾān Memorization Academy - the Taḥfīz program, after-school programs, Sister's Fiqh (Jurisprudence) & Tajweed (Qurʾānic elocution), and their flagship, 1-year academic course, the Tanwīr intensive.

As of 2022, weekly programs consist of informational and knowledgeable lectures, namely, Team Fajr (post-aurora lectures and breakfast), Ṣalawāt, and a weekly Tafsīr (exegesis) program, respectively, for brothers and sisters.

Gallery

See also
List of Mosques in Illinois
Islam in the United States
Timeline of Islamic history
Islamic Architecture
Islamic Art
  List of mosques in the Americas
  Lists of mosques 
  List of mosques in the United States

References

External links

2013 establishments in Illinois
Mosques completed in 2013
Mosques in Illinois
Mosque buildings with domes